|}

The Solerina Mares Novice Hurdle is a Grade 3 National Hunt hurdle race in Ireland which is open to mares aged four years or older. It is run at Fairyhouse over a distance of 2 miles and 2 furlongs (3,621 metres) and during the race there are ten hurdles to be jumped. The race is for novice hurdlers, and it is scheduled to take place each year in late January or early February.

The race was first run in 2011 and was awarded Grade 3 status in 2014.

In 2014 the race was renamed in honour of Solerina, the Irish mare who won 22 races between 2002 and 2006. The race is currently sponsored by EcoFriendly Cups.

Records
Most successful jockey (3 wins):
 Paul Townend -  Glens Melody (2013), Gitane Du Berlais (2014), Laurina (2018) 

Most successful trainer (8 wins): 
 Willie Mullins –  Ceol Rua (2012), Glens Melody (2013), Gitane Du Berlais (2014), Morning Run (2015), Limini (2016), Laurina (2018), Allegorie De Vassy (2022), Ashroe Diamond (2023)

Winners

 The 2013 running took place at Leopardstown after the original fixture was abandoned due to waterlogging.

See also
Horseracing in Ireland
List of Irish National Hunt races

References

Racing Post:

Fairyhouse Racecourse
National Hunt hurdle races
National Hunt races in Ireland
Recurring sporting events established in 2011